Jean-Baptiste Macquet (born 2 July 1983 in Dieppe, France) is a French rower. In 2010, he won the gold medal at the world rowing championship at Lake Karapiro in New Zealand, rowing in the coxless four, with Julien Desprès, Dorian Mortelette and Germain Chardin. He competed for France at the 2013 World Rowing Championships in the Men's Eight, finishing in 6th place.

External links
 
 

1983 births
Living people
French male rowers
World Rowing Championships medalists for France
Sportspeople from Dieppe, Seine-Maritime
Olympic rowers of France
Rowers at the 2004 Summer Olympics
Rowers at the 2008 Summer Olympics
European Rowing Championships medalists
21st-century French people